The St. Clairsville-Richland City School District serves St. Clairsville, Ohio and the surrounding areas.

Board of education 
 Michael Jacob, President
 Michael Fador, Vice President
 Amy Porter, Treasurer
 James Cook
 Harry White
 Bill Zanders
 Walter E. Skaggs, Superintendent

School Administrators 

 Middle School Principal Mike McKeever
 Elementary School Principal Amber Shepherd-Smith

See also 
 East Central Ohio ESC

External links 
 

School districts in Ohio
Education in Belmont County, Ohio